Adam Sinclair (born 18 April 1977) is a Scottish film and television actor. He is best known for his role as Jason Jackson in Boyz Unlimited and starred in the television series Mile High and has appeared in supporting roles in films like Van Wilder 2: The Rise of Taj.

Personal life
Sinclair is originally from East Kilbride, Scotland. He met his wife, Michelle Kath, in Hawaii while working on the set of To End All Wars. Michelle is the daughter of Terry Kath, a founding member of the rock band Chicago, former stepdaughter of actor Kiefer Sutherland. Sinclair lives with his wife near Venice Beach, California. The couple have two sons, Hamish and Robert Quinn.

Selected filmography 
Boyz Unlimited as Jason Jackson (1999)
To End All Wars as John (2001)
Hollyoaks: Movin' On as Jake (2001)
As If as Dan Parker (11 episodes between 2001–2002)
Mile High as Will O'Brien (38 episodes between 2003–2005)
Holby City as Alan Thomas (2005)
Nina's Heavenly Delights as Fish (2006)
Van Wilder 2: The Rise of Taj as Lord Wrightwood (2006)
Painkiller Jane as Nightclub Owner (2007)
The Summit as Wilcox (2008)
The Day of the Triffids (TV adaptation, BBC) as Ashdown (2009)Irvine Welsh's Ecstasy as Lloyd Buist (2011)Lip Service as  Dr. Declan Love (2012)Reel Life as Oliver Hargrove (2013)24: Live Another Day as Gavin Leonard (6 episodes 2014)Rizzoli & Isles'' as Kent Drake (23 Episodes 2015-2016)

References

External links

Scottish male film actors
Scottish male television actors
Living people
1977 births
Scottish expatriates in the United States
People from East Kilbride